Yuri Valentinovich Sergeev (born 16 July 1925) is a Russian speed skater who competed for the Soviet Union in the 1956 Winter Olympics. He finished fourth in the 500 metres event. He was born in Moscow.

World records 

Source: SpeedSkatingStats.com

References 

 Yuri Sergeev at SpeedSkatingStats.com
 profile

1925 births
Living people
Soviet male speed skaters
Olympic speed skaters of the Soviet Union
Speed skaters at the 1956 Winter Olympics
World record setters in speed skating